(born 1977) is a Japanese animator known for the short film La Maison en Petits Cubes which won the 2008 Academy Award for Best Animated Short Film. He also created The Diary Of Tortov Roddle, a surrealistic dream adventure.

Filmography

Influence 
In 2015, the Chilean writer José Baroja published the story "El hombre del terrón de azúcar", the winning text of the XIII Gonzalo Rojas Pizarro International Contest, inspired by the short film "Middonaitokafe" ("The Midnight Cafe"), included in the film .

References

External links
Robot Communications – Kato's production company 
Interview at Journal du Japon 
 
 Kunio Katō at Media Arts Database 

Japanese animators
Japanese animated film directors
Japanese surrealist artists
Surrealist filmmakers
People from Kagoshima
1977 births
Living people